Sune Wiktor Karlsson (1923–2006) was an international speedway rider from Sweden.

Speedway career 
Karlsson won two silver medals (1949 and 1952) and one bronze medal (1951) at the Swedish Individual Speedway Championship.

He rode in the top tier of British Speedway in 1952, riding for New Cross Rangers.

References 

1923 births
2006 deaths
Swedish speedway riders
New Cross Rangers riders
Wimbledon Dons riders
People from Solna Municipality
Sportspeople from Stockholm County